Li Dequan (Li Teh-Chuan ; 1896–1972) was the first Minister of Health of the People's Republic of China from 1949 to 1965.

Born in Tong County, Beijing, she participated in democracy campaign in early years. Dequan graduated from the Methodist Women's College and worked as a pastor's assistant at a Congregational church. She was married to Feng Yuxiang in 1924. During the Second Sino-Japanese War, she organized the "War-time Children Fostering Commission" and served as vice chairman. After the war, she founded All-China Women's Federation and became its chairman. In January 1948, she was elected central executive member of Revolutionary Committee of the Kuomintang. She joined the Chinese Communist Party in December 1958.

After formation of the People's Republic of China, Li was appointed the first Minister of Health of the PRC central government and she supported legalization of abortion. She also served as chairman of Red Cross Society of China. Her other posts included vice chairman of China-USSR Friendship Association, member of Commission of Culture and Education of the State Council, vice chairman of China National Sports Commission, and vice chairman of China People's National Commission of Children Protection.

Li served as a standing committee member of 1st to 3rd Chinese People's Political Consultative Conference (CPPCC), and vice chairman of 4th CPPCC.

She died in Beijing in 1972.

References 

1896 births
1972 deaths
People's Republic of China politicians from Beijing
Members of the Kuomintang
Republic of China politicians from Beijing
Chinese Communist Party politicians from Beijing
20th-century Chinese women politicians
Women government ministers of China
All-China Women's Federation people